The men's high jump event at the 2019 Summer Universiade was held on 8 and 10 July at the Stadio San Paolo in Naples.

Medalists

Results

Qualification
Qualification: 2.23 m (Q) or at least 12 best (q) qualified for the final.

Final

References

High
2019